Valery Nikolayevich Likhachov (born 5 December 1947) is a retired Russian cyclist. He was part of the Soviet team that won the 100 km team time trial event at the 1970 UCI Road World Championships and the 1972 Summer Olympics; individually, he finished in 34th place in the road race in 1972.

In 1972 he also won the Tour du Maroc and Tour de la Province de Namur. Next year he won six stages of the Peace Race, finishing third overall; in 1975, he won three stages individually, and the overall race in the team competition.

References

1947 births
Living people
People from Tatarstan
Olympic cyclists of the Soviet Union
Olympic gold medalists for the Soviet Union
Cyclists at the 1972 Summer Olympics
Olympic medalists in cycling
Russian male cyclists
Soviet male cyclists
Medalists at the 1972 Summer Olympics
UCI Road World Champions (elite men)
Sportspeople from Tatarstan